Fadi Haddad (born on 21 December 1974) Lebanese music video and movies director who works with the biggest music studios in Lebanon and the Arab world such as Rotana Group and Lifestylez, and have worked with many famous Arab singers such as George Wassouf, Walid Toufic, Abdallah Al Rowaished Rami Ayach, Majid Al Mohandis, Saber Rebaï, Nancy Ajram, Diana Haddad, Assi Hellani, Najwa Karam, Fares Karam, Mayada El Hennawy, Nawal Al Zoghbi, Dina Hayek, Yara and Wael Jassar. Additionally, he worked on TV commercials for Lebanon and the Arab world for international Brands such as Samsung and MAC cosmetics. He also directed many films such as Mahraja in 2018 and "Meheret" in 2021. In 2007, he launched his own Production house Retina Films and became the first director to have his own film equipment and offer full production services and shooting studios for music videos, TV commercials and films.

Personal life
Since December 2009 he is married to Carole Samaha, and he have three sons with her. he settle in Dhour El Choueir in Mount Lebanon Governorate.

Work Life
Fadi Haddad entered the world of Film and Television in his early twenties, he started in 1992 as a Director of Photography until he got his big break in 2004, directing his first ever music video for Najwa Karam. Since then he went on to direct music videos for the Biggest artists in Lebanon and the Arab world such as George Wassouf, Walid Toufic, Rami Ayach, Nancy Ajram, Diana Haddad, Assi Hellani, Najwa Karam, Fares Karam, Mayada El Hennawy, Nawal Al Zoghbi, Dina Hayek, Yara and Wael Jassar. Additionally, he worked on many TV Commercials for international brands such as Samsung and MAC cosmetics In Lebanon, Gulf and Egypt. In 2007, he became the first Arab director to have his own Production House "Retina Films" that owns all cinematic film equipment and provides all production services and big professional shooting studios for music videos, TV commercials and films. In 2017 he directed his first feature film "The Maharaja" starring Ziad Bourji and then directed his latest film "Meheret" in 2021 that explores the life of an Ethiopian lady living and working in Lebanon during the Lebanese revolution and the bombing of the port in Beirut in August 4th. Both his films have received wide positive criticism from both critics and the audience.

Music videos

References

External links
 Fadi Haddad in IMDb

1974 births
Living people
Lebanese music video directors
Lebanese Christians
Lebanese film directors
People from Dhour El Choueir